Wilcox Avenue is a major avenue of Los Angeles, running north–south through Hollywood, to the west of Cahuenga Boulevard. It begins to the north of Franklin Avenue from North Cahuenga Boulevard, and then runs south, crossing Sunset Boulevard, Santa Monica Boulevard and Melrose Avenue. The avenue grew primarily as an affluent residential road in the early 20th century, with the building of expensive luxury apartments. Silent actress Rosemary Theby once lived at 1907 Wilcox Avenue. The Mark Twain Hotel, a white stucco hotel named after writer Mark Twain, is located at 1622 Wilcox and was recently (2016) restored and converted into a boutique inn. There are several bars and restaurants including Paladar, a Cuban restaurant and bar at 1651 Wilcox Avenue, and The Nacional, a Havana-style cocktail bar next door at 1645. 1626 North Wilcox Avenue is the location of a company known as Hollywood Mail which rents hundreds of physical addresses for those who wish to make it appear that their business is actually located at that address.

References

Streets in Los Angeles
Streets in Hollywood, Los Angeles